Mack A. "Bodi" White, Jr. (born April 7, 1956) is an American politician from Louisiana who has represented District 6 in the Louisiana State Senate since 2012. A Republican, White previously served in the Louisiana House of Representatives for District 64 between 2004 and 2012.

Electoral history
White was first elected to the Louisiana House of Representatives in 2003, succeeding Tony Perkins. In 2011, White successfully ran for the Louisiana State Senate's 6th district, narrowly defeating Exxon executive Mike Mannino in the first round.

In 2016, White ran for East Baton Rouge Parish mayor-president, but lost in the runoff election to Democrat Sharon Weston Broome.

References

1956 births
Living people
Southeastern Louisiana University alumni
Loyola University New Orleans alumni
Republican Party members of the Louisiana House of Representatives
Republican Party Louisiana state senators
Politicians from Baton Rouge, Louisiana
Businesspeople from Louisiana
21st-century American politicians
American United Methodists
People from Central, Louisiana